Tariq Jamil (born 1 October 1953), is a Pakistani Deobandi television preacher, religious writer, scholar, and a member of the Tablighi Jamaat. The recipient of the Pride of Performance award, Jamil has been named in The 500 Most Influential Muslims every year since 2012.  In the 2023 edition of the publication, he was ranked as the 32nd most influential Muslim in the world.

Early life and education 
Tariq Jamil was born on 1 October 1953 in Mian Channu, Pakistan. Jamil belongs to the Sahu subtribe of Chauhan Rajputs. His family ruled Tulamba during the reign of Sher Shah Suri, who also distributed the lands around Tulamba.

Jamil completed his primary education at Central Model School, Lahore. He is an alumnus of Government College University, Lahore, and received his Islamic education from Jamia Arabia, Raiwind, where he studied the Qur’an, hadiths, Sufism, logic, and fiqh.

Jamil enrolled in King Edward Medical College after finishing a pre-medical education from Government College Lahore, but he left the college without completing his MBBS when he decided to pursue religious education.

Career 

Jamil has delivered religious sermons internationally and comes from a school of thought called Deobandi. He supports ethnic and sectarian harmony.

Jamil's sermons focus on "self-purification, avoidance of violence, observance of Allah’s orders and pursuing the way of Prophet Muhammad".

Jamil has been named as one as of The 500 Most Influential Muslims in the world by the Royal Aal al-Bayt Institute for Islamic Thought in Jordan every year since 2012.

Views on COVID 
In April 2020, he blamed God's wrath at dishonesty in society and the immodesty of women for the outbreak and spread of COVID-19. Besides praying for the welfare of the country and an end to vice, he said "when a Muslim’s daughter practices immodesty and the youth(boys) indulges in immorality, then Allah’s torment is unto such a nation."

Human rights proponents and other members of Pakistani society condemned the remarks. Human Rights Minister Shireen Mazari responded by saying "misogynistic' and 'ignorant' comments blaming women and youth for the ongoing coronavirus crisis were 'absolutely unacceptable".

Revenue 
Jamil launched his flagship clothing brand named MTJ Brand. It was launched in March 2021. Its headquarters are located in Karachi. It is claimed the revenue from the business is used to fund his madressahs, and build schools and hospitals in the country. Jamil also launched the Maulana Tariq Jamil Foundation, which is a non-profit organization in Tulamba, Khanewal. It is a project that gathers funds for social work, health, and education to serve the people of Pakistan.

Awards

Bibliography

See also
 Mufti Tariq Masood

References

External links

1953 births
Living people
Central Model School, Lahore alumni
Government College University, Lahore alumni
Islamic television preachers
Muslim missionaries
Pakistani Islamic religious leaders
Pakistani media personalities
Pakistani religious writers
Pakistani Sunni Muslim scholars of Islam
Pakistani YouTubers
People from Khanewal District
Punjabi people
Recipients of the Pride of Performance
Tablighi Jamaat people
20th-century Muslims
21st-century Muslims
21st-century Muslim scholars of Islam